Northern NSW Football (NNSWF) is the governing body of soccer in the north of New South Wales, Australia. It is a member of the national governing body, Football Australia. The Federation was established the 9 September 1884 as the Northern District British Football Association. To fall in line with the global football identity, the federation was re-branded to Northern NSW Football on 25 October 2006.

Formation
On 9 September 1884, the Northern District British Football Association was established. On 25 October 2006, the Northern NSW Football was created due to internal restructuring and re-branding.

Membership structure
The NNSWF, the governing body for football in the northern regions of New South Wales, is Federation Member of Football Federation Australia (FFA) and as such reports directly to the FFA. There are seven constituent members of the NNSWF with each being responsible for a geographical Zone:

 Football Far North Coast
 Football Mid North Coast
 Hunter Valley Football
 Macquarie Football
 Newcastle Football
 North Coast Football
 Northern Inland Football

Competitions

National Premier Leagues Northern NSW
The National Premier Leagues Northern NSW (NPL NNSW), previously known as the State League is the premier competition in Northern NSW involving 11 clubs from within the Hunter Region. The competition consists of four (7) grades – 1st Grade, Reserve Grade, Under 18's, Under 16's, Under 15's, Under 14's and Under 13's. The 1st Grade competition will consist of twelve (12) teams in 2023 due to the promotion of New Lambton Eagles from Northern League One.

Northern League One
The Northern League One is the underpinning competition to the National Premier Leagues Northern NSW with promotion and relegation between the leagues. From 2023, the competition will involve 9 clubs from within the Hunter Region. The competition consists of seven (7) grades – 1st Grade, Reserve Grade, Under 18s, Under 16s, Under 15s, Under 14s and Under 13s.

Zone Leagues
Consisting of four divisions (Zone Premier League, Zone League One, Zone League Two, Zone League Three) with 10 clubs each which compete in promotion and relegation between the 4 divisions.

Women's Premier League
The Women's Premier League is the premier women's competition and involves six clubs from within NNSW.

Past winners

Newcastle and Northern District

1880 to 1919

1907 Senior Competition abandoned for rebuild. All age competition.

1920s

1950 to 1969

References

External links
 Official website

Soccer governing bodies in Australia
Soccer in New South Wales
Sports organizations established in 1884
1884 establishments in the British Empire